The Segunda División  División de Plata is the second professional futsal league in Spain; it is within of the Liga Nacional de Futbol Sala. It was founded in the 1993–94 season with the current name.
The División de Plata league, which also is played under UEFA rules, currently consists in  one group of 14 teams, including teams like Futsal Cartagena, Segovia Futsal, O'Parrulo or ElPozo Ciudad de Murcia.

From 2011–12 season onwards, División de Plata will be known as Segunda División.

The Liga Nacional de Futsal includes:
Primera División — 1st level.
Segunda División de Futsal — 2nd level.

Liga championship rules

Each team of every division has to play with all the other teams of its division twice, once at home and the other at the opponent's stadium. This means that in Segunda División de Futsal the league ends after every team plays 30 matches.

Like many other leagues in continental Europe, the Segunda División de Futsal takes a winter break once each team has played half its schedule. One unusual feature of the league is that the two halves of the season are played in the same order—that is, the order of each team's first-half fixtures is repeated in the second half of the season, with the only difference being the stadiums used.

Each victory adds 3 points to the team in the league ranking. Each drawn adds 1 point.head-to-head.
At the end of the league, the winner is:
The team that has most points in the ranking.
If two or more teams are level on points, the winner is the team that has the best results
If there is no winner after applying the second rule, then the team with the best overall goal difference wins.

2015–16 season teams

2015–16 regular season standings
2015–16 season:

Teams promoted by year
Source:

References

External links
Liga Nacional de Fútbol Sala

 
2ª
2